Drumcorps is the metal/breakcore musical project of American musician Aaron Spectre. He is currently based in Amsterdam, Netherlands.

Spectre was born and raised in rural Massachusetts. He began Drumcorps after moving to Berlin to branch out creatively. He describes Drumcorps's sound as "solid songwriting mixed with an upfront intensity, human heart & soul mixed with machine precision". In 2007, Grist won the Sound Art Award at Austria's Ars Electronica.

In 2015, Spectre recorded with drummer Igor Cavalera (of Sepultura, Soulwax, Cavalera Conspiracy, and Mixhell) for his album Falling Forward.

Discography

As Drumcorps

Albums
Grist (2006)
Lost Tracks (2007)
Falling Forward (2015)
Creatures (2022)

EPs
Heartstrong (2012)
Jungle Boots (2016)
Building The Panopticon (2016)
Roots We Seek (2018)
Better Days (2021)
For the Living (2021)

As Aaron Spectre

Albums
 Lost Tracks (2012)

Singles and EPs
 Ocean (2005)
 "Say More Fire" (2009)
 Building the Panopticon (2016)
 The Quickening (2020)
 Creating the Future (2020)
 Extraterrestrial (2020)

References

Breakcore
American electronic musicians
American experimental musicians
People from Massachusetts
Living people
Year of birth missing (living people)